Toulouse-Saint-Cyprien-Arènes is a railway station in Toulouse, Occitanie, France. The station is on the Toulouse-Saint-Agne–Auch railway. The train services are operated by SNCF.

Location 
The station is located in the Arènes district of Toulouse, on the Toulouse-Auch line.

Train services
The station is served by TER Occitanie line 16 (Toulouse – Auch).

The station is served by the following services:

Regional services (TER Occitanie) Toulouse – L'Isle-Jourdain – Auch
Line C of Toulouse urban trains

Public transport
The station is also served by metro line A, tram T1 and T2 and buses.

References 

Railway stations in Haute-Garonne